Mahdiyeh or Mehdiyeh may refer to:
 Mehdiyeh, Chaharmahal and Bakhtiari
 Mahdiyeh, Fars
 Mahdiyeh, Ilam
 Mahdiyeh, Chadegan, Isfahan Province
 Mehdiyeh, Kerman
 Mahdiyeh, Khuzestan
 Mehdiyeh, South Khorasan